"Azure" is a 1937 song composed by Duke Ellington with lyrics by Irving Mills. The composition is an example of Ellington's early use of bi- and polytonality, and some parts of it are almost atonal in nature.

Notable recordings
Ella Fitzgerald - Ella Fitzgerald Sings the Duke Ellington Songbook (1957) "Ella at Duke's Place" (1965)
Earl Grant - Midnight Sun (1962)
Cecil Taylor - Jazz Advance (1956)
 Tony Bennett - "Bennett Sings Ellington: Hot & Cool" (1999)

See also
List of 1930s jazz standards

References

Songs with music by Duke Ellington
Songs with lyrics by Irving Mills
Jazz songs
1930s jazz standards
1937 songs